Ozyorny Microdistrict is a microdistrict (a residential area) of the urban-type settlement of Egvekinot in Iultinsky District of Chukotka Autonomous Okrug. It was formerly a separate rural locality (a selo). Its population in 2006 was estimated at 650.

History

Ozyorny was established in 1952 to house the workers and administrators of the nearby diesel power station. In the 1960s, it expanded to accommodate surveyors plotting the course of the road to Iultin as well as those involved in the Mainypyntyvaam geological survey expedition. The microdistrict remained home to a large group of geologists up until the 1990s. The majority of these people are now gone because the Iultin Mining and Processing Enterprise and the Eastern Chukotka Geological Survey Expedition were liquidated. Today, Ozyorny has a high school, a post office, and a food store.

Transportation
Ozyorny is situated on the Iultin-Egvekinot road. About  further north, spanning the road to Iultin, is a metal arch signifying the point where the Arctic Circle bisects the road. Nearby are the ruins of one of the camps used to house the prisoners who built the road. The road is the longest in Chukotka. There is also a small network of roads within the microdistrict.

Climate
Ozyorny Microdistrict has a Continental Subarctic or Boreal (taiga) climate (Dfc).

See also
List of inhabited localities in Iultinsky District

References

Notes

Sources

M. Strogoff, P-C Brochet, and D. Auzias Petit Futé: Chukotka (2006). "Avant-Garde" Publishing House

Chukotka Autonomous Okrug